A Torah database (מאגר תורני or מאגר יהדות) is a collection of classic Jewish texts in electronic form, the kinds of texts which, especially in Israel, are often called "The Traditional Jewish Bookshelf" (ארון הספרים היהודי); the texts are in their original languages (Hebrew or Aramaic). These databases contain either keyed-in digital texts or a collection of page-images from printed editions. Given the nature of traditional Jewish Torah study, which involves extensive citation and cross-referencing among hundreds of texts written over the course of thousands of years, many Torah databases also make extensive use of hypertext links.

A Torah database usually refers to a collection of primary texts, rather than translations or secondary research and reference materials.

Digital Text Software Packages

The Bar-Ilan Responsa Project
The very first such database was the Bar Ilan Responsa Project, which began in 1963 at the Weizmann Institute in Israel, migrated to Bar-Ilan University soon thereafter, and was up and running by 1967.  It became available in time-sharing mode from university terminals in 1979, was transferred to CD-ROM in 1990, and version 1.0 was offered for sale to the public in 1992.  The current version is number 28 or 28+ (the "plus" version contains an important secondary reference called the Encyclopedia Talmudit).

The Responsa Project tries to base its electronic texts on the most accurate printed editions (though it seems that it is sometimes prevented from doing so because of copyright considerations), and it has a reputation for relatively error-free electronic texts based upon those editions.  It also features approximately 360,000 hypertext links between the various collections within the database, as well as a topical halakhic index for the Shulchan Aruch and selected responsa.  Since its early years it has employed a sophisticated search-engine specifically designed for Hebrew language texts.

In recent years (at least since version 10 in 2002), the Responsa Project has made updates available once a year, usually between the Passover and Shavuot holidays, although this varies considerably.  Sometimes they release an update after the holiday of Chanukah or after the holiday of Purim. It depends on how much they have completed.

In January, 2007, the responsa project became available in an online edition.

In April, 2007 the Responsa Project won the Israel Prize for Jewish studies.

Currently (as of 2018, version 26+) according to their list the number of seforim listed  is about 914 (excluding the Chazon Ish which is only available for searching).  The Kabbalah section includes only the Zohar, and a few works listed under Otzar HaMidrashim.  However, the other sections contain many essential and important seforim.

DBS Master Library
DBS rivals the Bar-Ilan Responsa project in size.  It has less in the overall area of Halakha and fewer responsa, but rivals Bar Ilan's Reponsa project in: Jewish philosophy and Mussar.  To date, the latest Bar Ilan and the latest DBS versions are comparable mostly, in terms of number of texts in these areas.  Bar Ilan surpasses DBS in the commentaries on Talmud Bavli, the Reponsa, commentaries on the Mishneh Torah etc.  DBS surpasses Bar Ilan in the area of Hasidut and Kabbalah. In recent years, Bar Ilan has included a great number of texts that considered to be mostly accurate, and mostly error free and has become the gold standard of any Torah database.  DBS has lagged behind, although its Kabbalah section is fantastic, it is not clear which texts were used as well as their accuracy and whether the text presented is accurate.

DBS contains a good number of Hebrew texts with vowels (niqqud); see below.  Criticisms: It does not have extensive hypertext links between its various large collections, the texts are considered to be inaccurate and may have some errors in them.  It is not as comprehensive in many areas, compared with Bar Ilan.

Soncino Classics Collection 

Produced by Davka corporation, Soncino Classics Collection includes
 Soncino English translations of the Tanach, Babylonian Talmud, Midrash Rabbah, and Zohar;
 Hebrew and Aramaic texts of the Tanach, Babylonian Talmud, Midrash Rabbah and Zohar, as well as Rashi's commentary on Talmud.

Soncino Classics Collection is a commercial software.

The Torah Bookshelf ("Halamish")
Otzar ha-Poskim (also see below) produces "The Torah Bookshelf," a large digital collection of basic texts called "Halamish" (Ha-Sifriyah ha-Toranit) in Hebrew, currently in version 3.0.

Ariel
Ariel (currently version 2.1) uses the same software as Otzar ha-Poskim's "Torah Bookshelf" and is similar to it in scope (a large basic collection), but many of the titles in the two collections are not the same.

Mikra'ot Gedolot Haketer
Bar-Ilan University's project to produce an entirely new critical edition of the Mikra'ot Gedolot is also being made available not only in printed volumes, but also in electronic form. The project contains four main elements:
The biblical text (based on the Aleppo codex and a careful reconstruction of its missing parts) is keyed-in, including vowels and cantillation signs, allowing for sophisticated research on details of grammar.
The masorah is also keyed in (also based on the Aleppo codex and supplemented by a special commentary).
The Targum is included with vowels, based on the Yemenite Taj.
The biblical commentaries are also keyed-in as fresh new critical editions, including textual variants from manuscripts.

The CD-ROM is currently in version 2.0 (beta).

(Note: Although also under the auspices of Bar-Ilan University, this project is unrelated to the Bar-Ilan Responsa Project.)

Digital Hebrew Texts with Vowels (Niqqud)

Tanakh
Tanakh is available as a keyed-in digital Hebrew text with vowels (niqqud) in all of the above software packages.

Tanakh with both vowels and cantillation signs is available in the Mikra'ot Gedolot Haketer package and as online freeware from Mechon Mamre, Hebrew Wikisource and Base HaSefer (see the latter three below).  All of these versions are based on the Aleppo codex, but Mechon Mamre's edition is based on the editing method of Rabbi Mordecai Breuer, which differs slightly from the Mikra'ot Gedolot Haketer edition in some small details. Hebrew Wikisource is similar to both of these versions (see a full description) and the text at Base HaSefer is based on that of Hebrew Wikisource.

Targum
Both Targum Onkelos on the Torah and Targum Jonathan on Nevi'im are vowelized (based on Yemenite manuscripts) in the digital texts of Mikra'ot Gedolot Haketer.  Targum Onkelos is vowelized in the Judaic Bookshelf package and as online freeware from Mechon Mamre, Hebrew Wikisource and Base HaSefer.

Mishnah
The Mishnah is included as a keyed-in digital Hebrew text with vowels in all of the general software packages above. The vowels in the "Halamish" package seem to be based upon the Albeck edition of the Mishnah (see Mishnah).

Siddur and liturgy
Siddur: Digital  with vowels (according to various customs) are included in DBS (Ashkenaz, Sefard, Sefaradi/Edot Mizrah), Judaic Bookshelf (Ashkenaz, Sefard), and Ariel (Ashkenaz, Sefard, Sefaradi/Edot Mizrah).

Popular ethical works (musar)
Popular ethical works are normally vowelized in published editions. DBS's collection of such works includes vowels in the electronic editions.

Popular halakhic works
Some of these are also vowelized in DBS.

Page-Image software packages

Otzar HaHochma
This project is based on page-images of 128,200 scanned Jewish books. It is possible to add additional libraries (Mosad Harav Kook, Machon Yerushalayim Publications, Ahavat Shalom Publishers, and Kehot Publication Society). Additionally, the user can find books by topic. The system has features which turns it to a learning tool.

Otzar ha-Shut
Otzar ha-Poskim produces "Otzar ha-Shut" (hyperlinked images of individual responsa indexed according to the order of the Shulhan Arukh).  This package also includes "Halamish" (see above).

The Steinzaltz Talmud on CD-ROM
The Steinsaltz Talmud is available as searchable PDF images on CD-ROM.  All material from the printed edition is included, but it can be copied and pasted only as images and not as digital text.

Wikimedia Torah study projects
Text study projects at Wikisource allow contributors to help build free content Torah databases at Wikimedia through volunteer typing and editing. Please note that in most instances, these projects proceed much faster in Hebrew than in English.
Mikraot Gedolot (Rabbinic Bible) in Hebrew (sample) and English (sample).
Cantillation at the "Vayavinu Bamikra" Project in Hebrew (lists nearly 200 recordings) and English.
Mishnah in Hebrew and English (sample).
Shulchan Aruch in Hebrew and English (Hebrew text with English translation).
Aruch HaShulchan is available in a newly formatted, digital Hebrew version at Hebrew Wikisource (over 600 chapters are currently available). See also Orach Chaim index.

Free Torah Libraries Online
All of the databases listed in the main article are patented commercial products, and may not be used without permission of the copyright holders. There are also some online projects that make either digital texts, or public domain images of old books, available to the public for free:

Hebrew Wikisource
Hebrew Wikisource contains thousands of free content Torah texts in a digital library that is continually being expanded and improved by volunteers.

The      ארון הספרים היהודי  (Aron Ha-Sefarim Ha-Yehudi) project at Wikisource has hundreds of texts available online.

HebrewBooks.org (public domain images)
This website was founded in order to preserve old American Hebrew books that are out of print or circulation, but it expanded its mission "to include all Torah Seforim (=books) ever printed".  About 50,000 out-of-print books and journals may be downloaded as PDF images. While many titles are in the public domain in the United States, they may not be in the public domain in other countries. Additionally, there are also many copyrighted works that have been submitted by the original authors or their families for inclusion within this website.

The website supports textual search, using optical character recognition to convert the images into text.

A beta version of the site contains enhancements not present on the main site.

Mechon Mamre (digital freeware)
Mechon Mamre makes the following digital Hebrew texts available as freeware (but claims a copyright on them):
Tanakh (including versions with vowels and cantillation signs)
Four major sources of the Oral Law:
Mishnah (without vowels, based on Maimonides' version)
Tosefta
Jerusalem Talmud
Babylonian Talmud
Mishneh Torah of Maimonides (based on Yemenite manuscripts)
The digital texts available at Snunit  are taken (with permission) from Mechon Mamre.

The Daat Library (digital freeware)
A wide variety of primary texts, including many of R' Yosef Qafih's ("Kapach") and other more critical editions.

The Sefaria Project
Sefaria is a free culture project that includes interactive bilingual texts collected from public sources or created by volunteer translators. Sefaria highlights interconnections between texts from Tanakh, Mishnah, Talmud, Midrash, Halakha, Kabbalah, Chasidut and includes a free tool for making source sheets.

In February 2017, it was announced that the Koren/Steinsaltz English translation of the Talmud and the Steinsaltz Hebrew translation of the talmud would both be placed into the commons with a CC-BY-NC license, and made available through Sefaria.

Sages of Ashkenaz (digital freeware)
Sages of Ashkenaz provides free digital text to various Ashkenazi seforim.

Seforim Online (public domain images)
"Seforim Online" ("seforim" means "books") provides PDF images of several hundred classic rabbinic texts for downloading.  Many or most of them are hard-to-find or rare editions, and all are in the public domain.

TorahTexts.org (searchable Torah Texts)
Provides single point of search and access to many Hebrew and English texts available on the Internet

Sifrei Kodesh Search - (Firefox add-on for searching texts)
A convenient way to search through many Hebrew texts directly from your browser. It also allows you to narrow your search down to a specific text or genre of texts.

Base HaSefer

Base HaSefer (in beta test) aims to enable search and analysis of Sifrei Kodesh as if the content implicitly forms a relational database. It contains the full text of the Tanach and Targum Onkelos with vowels and cantillation marks and contains the following functionality:

 Simple and advanced search: Search for verses by entering one to many terms with optional entry as an exact quote. Vowels and cantillation marks can be specified and one can also search for words and phrases based on word roots or gematria.  Other features include: unlimited use of wildcard characters; ability to load and save searches; multiple result tabs; detection of anagrams and regular expressions; detection of word position in relation to other words and to the beginning or end of verses or sections; filtering search results to fine-grained, specific sections of the Tanach.
 Tanach viewer windows: A window which presents parallel views of the original Hebrew, the Targum, a Torah scroll font view and more. Summary rows can expand to display the full  text; a cantillation analysis viewer displaying an interactive tree-view of verses broken down by cantillation rules.
 Reports and statistics: A page displaying lists of terms according to their usage frequency in Tanach; A text comparator page which analyzes two different selections of Tanach based on 1) common words or phrases 2) common word sequences 3) word differences.

References

Torah
Religion databases
Judaism software